Fairview Hospital may refer to:

M Health Fairview, a network of hospitals and clinics in Minnesota, including the University of Minnesota Medical Center
Fairview Hospital (Cleveland), a part of the Cleveland Clinic in Cleveland, Ohio
Fairview Hospital (Massachusetts), in Great Barrington, Massachusetts, part of Berkshire Health Systems
Fairview Training Center, previously known as the Fairview Hospital and Training Center in Salem, Oregon

Trauma centers